Tenaja Canyon Creek, a stream or arroyo, tributary to San Mateo Creek, in the Cleveland National Forest in Riverside County, California.  Its source is at an altitude of 1875 feet.  The creek has its source at the confluence of arroyos from El Potrero del Tenaja, Redonda Mesa and Tenaja Mountain highlands. and it flows northwestward  miles down Tenaja Canyon to its mouth and its confluence near Fishermans Camp, at an elevation of 1112 feet with San Mateo Creek. The word may refer to the arroyo El Portero del Tenaja or to the topographic structure.

References

Tenaja Canyon Creek
Tenaja Canyon Creek
Tenaja Canyon Creek
Rivers of Southern California